Onay is a Turkish surname. Notable people with the surname include:

 Belit Onay, German politician, Mayor of Hanover
 Gülsin Onay (born 1954), Turkish concert pianist
 Gündüz Tekin Onay, Turkish footballer
 Yılmaz Onay (1937–2018), Turkish author, theatre director, and translator

Turkish-language surnames